Antoni Vila Casas (born November 27, 1930, Barcelona) is a Spanish philanthropist and former pharmaceutical executive.

Biography
Casas studied Batchillerato in Jesuites school in 1948. Later, he studied pharmacy and was graduated in 1956 by Universitat de Barcelona. In 1960, he founded Laboratorios Prodes S.A, and was the president of the board of directors.

During the following years, Casas acquired some laboratories until creating Prodesfarma Holding in 1986. At the same time, he founded Fundació Vila Casas, being the president, and promoting Catalan art and giving awards with the objective of helping health and art initiatives.

In 1995, he acquired Aquilea Laboratories. In 1997, he sold Prodesfarma to Grupo Almirall.

Awards received 

 1996 - Grand Cross of the Civil Honor
 1999 - Creu de Sant Jordi Award
 2004 - Premio Montblanc al mecenazgo
 2012 - Gold Medal of the Cultural Merit de l'Ajuntament de Barcelona.

References 

Living people
1930 births
Spanish company founders
Spanish philanthropists
University of Barcelona alumni